Ardatovka (Arźat) is a rural locality (a village) in Kakrybashevsky Selsoviet, Tuymazinsky District, Bashkortostan, Russia. The population was 47 as of 2010. There are 2 streets.

Geography 
Ardatovka is located 16 km north of Tuymazy (the district's administrative centre) by road. Balagach-Kul is the nearest rural locality.

References 

Rural localities in Tuymazinsky District